General elections were held in Republika Srpska on 11 November 2000 alongside nationwide parliamentary elections. They were the third general elections in Republika Srpska since the end of Bosnian War.

After refusing to nominate Milorad Dodik as Prime Minister, President Nikola Poplašen was deposed in 1999 after less than a year in position by Carlos Westendorp, the High Representative for Bosnia and Herzegovina. Petar Đokić was named acting president until election. In the meantime Poplašen's Serbian Radical Party was banned from elections.

Elected President was Mirko Šarović from Serb Democratic Party, which was in power during war years. The runner up was Milorad Dodik, then incumbent List of prime ministers of Republika Srpska.

On parliamentary election Serb Democratic Party gained majority of seats fourth time in a row, but unlike past two election circles managed to form a government with Mladen Ivanić from Party of Democratic Progress elected new Prime Minister.

Results

President

Parliament

References

2000 in Bosnia and Herzegovina
Elections in Republika Srpska